The Citizen Force was the name of the general military reserve force of several British Commonwealth countries. The term may refer to:

 Citizen Force (South Africa)
 Australian Army Reserve
  South West African Territorial Force

See also
 Citizen Air Force
 Militia
 National Guard
State defense force
Civil Air Patrol
 Citizen Soldier (disambiguation)
 Territorial Army (disambiguation)